Drama of the Lark is a 1963 Hungarian drama film directed by László Ranódy. It was entered into the 1964 Cannes Film Festival where Antal Páger won the award for Best Actor.  It is based on the novel Pacsirta (translated into English as Skylark) by the Hungarian author Dezső Kosztolányi.

Cast
 Antal Páger as Vajkay Ákos
 Klári Tolnay as Tóni, Vajkayné
 Anna Nagy as Pacsirta, Vajkay lánya
 Margit Bara as Dobáné
 Mari Törőcsik as Margit
 Zoltán Latinovits as Miklós
 Ferenc Bessenyei as Latintanár
 Iván Darvas as Füzess Feri
 Zoltán Greguss as Környei Bálint
 Sándor Szakács as Cziffra Géza
 Gyula Gózon as Pincér
 Sándor Tompa as Lipiczky
 Ferenc Kiss as Bankigazgató
 József Szendrő as Orvos
 János Zách as Doba

References

External links

1963 films
1960s Hungarian-language films
Hungarian black-and-white films
1963 drama films
Films directed by László Ranódy
Hungarian drama films